Valentina Tronel (born 6 April 2009), better known as simply Valentina, is a French child singer best known for winning the Junior Eurovision Song Contest 2020. In 2016, she took part in the French version of The Voice Kids. She represented France in the Junior Eurovision Song Contest 2020 with the song "", and went on to win the competition, becoming the first French entrant to win the Junior Eurovision Song Contest.

Biography 
Valentina was born in Rennes, the capital of Brittany, northwestern France, and lives in Thorigné-Fouillard. She has an older brother. Her mother is an Italian-language teacher and her father is a real estate agent.

From her early childhood, Valentina was surrounded by music: she said; "I grew up in a family where everyone sang: my mother [sang] in bars, my father [did] Michael Jackson impressions. [...] Music has always been part of my life.". She said she was probably two and a half when she sang her first song. Her mother sang her to sleep with Italian songs and the first songs Valentina sang were Italian.

Career
In 2016, Valentina took part in the fourth season of The Voice Kids France (2017) but she was rejected at the blind auditions stage. Valentina was the show's youngest contestant that season, she was seven when she applied for the show and when her blind audition was recorded, and eight on 2 September of the following year when the show was broadcast.

In 2018, Valentina joined the child musical group Kids United Nouvelle Génération, which is a "new generation" of the group Kids United.

As its youngest member, Valentina has become a mascot for the group. On 22 June 2021, the production has announced the end of the Kids United adventure and the cancellation of the final Best of Tour.

2020 Junior Eurovision Song Contest 
On 9 October 2020, France Télévisions announced it had selected Valentina to represent France with a song titled "" at the Junior Eurovision Song Contest, which was held in Warsaw, Poland, on 29 November. On 16 October, the song was released as a single and a music video was unveiled on the same day. As of 26 April 2021, the video has received nearly 12 million views. Valentina won the contest with a score of 200 points, 48 more than second-placed Kazakhstan and 67 more than third-placed Spain. This was France's first victory at the contest.

Musical style and influences 
Valentina's idol is Ariana Grande, who she said is "very pretty" and "has a wonderful voice". Her favorite of Grande's songs is "Love Me Harder". Valentina also likes the music of Celine Dion, that of French artists  Maître Gims, Louane, Patrick Fiori, Dadju., and that of Breton artist Nolwenn Leroy, whose voice, she says, she "just loves". Apart from singing, Valentina also raps in French. She also sings in Italian, in particular songs by her mother's favorite singer Laura Pausini. At her blind audition for The Voice Kids France in 2016, Valentina also performed a Pausini song called "".

Discography

Studio Albums 
 Plus loin qu'un rêve (2021)

Singles

Filmography 
2017: The Voice Kids (season 4) — candidate 
2020: Junior Eurovision Song Contest 2020 — winner 
2021: PAW Patrol: The Movie – Liberty

References

External links 
 Valentina profile on the Junior Eurovision official website

2009 births
Living people
21st-century French women singers
Child pop musicians
Junior Eurovision Song Contest entrants
Junior Eurovision Song Contest winners
French child singers
French pop singers
Breton musicians
The Voice Kids contestants
Kids United members
French women rappers
Musicians from Rennes